North Bridge railway station, also known as Halifax North Bridge, served on the Halifax and Ovenden Junction Railway in West Yorkshire, England. The North bridge itself had to be rebuilt  higher by the L&YR and the GNR to clear the tracks. The station has been since demolished and a leisure centre built on the site, the only real remnant of the station is the Iron Foot Bridge and in the distance Old Lane Tunnel.

References

External links
 North Bridge station on navigable 1947 O. S. map

Disused railway stations in Calderdale
Former Halifax and Ovenden Junction Railway stations
Railway stations in Great Britain opened in 1880
Railway stations in Great Britain closed in 1955